Robert Kolendowicz  (born 26 September 1980 in Poznań) is a Polish retired professional footballer.

National team
Kolendowicz has made one appearance for the Poland national football team.

References

External links
 
 

1980 births
Living people
Polish footballers
Poland international footballers
Amica Wronki players
Lech Poznań players
Warta Poznań players
Dyskobolia Grodzisk Wielkopolski players
GKS Bełchatów players
Korona Kielce players
ŁKS Łódź players
Zagłębie Lubin players
Pogoń Szczecin players
Flota Świnoujście players
K.R.C. Genk players
Ekstraklasa players
Footballers from Poznań
Association football midfielders